Gavin Thomas Leatherwood (born June 7, 1994) is an American actor and singer. He is best known for portraying Nicholas Scratch on Netflix's Chilling Adventures of Sabrina (2018–2020). He also plays the role of a university student, Nico, in the series The Sex Lives of College Girls available on HBO Max. He released his debut single "Just For Tonight" on February 19, 2021. Also the singles “Be My Lover” and “Driftwood Mermaid” are available on all platforms.

Early life 
Leatherwood was born on June 7, 1994  in Maui, Hawaii. He spent his youth in California and moved to Oregon when he was 18. He is mostly of Irish descent, and also has English, Spanish, Welsh, other European and Native American ancestry.

Acting career
In the beginning of his acting career, Leatherwood performed in various theatrical plays such as All My Sons and Peter Pan. In 2017, he made a cameo appearance in an episode for NCIS and Grown-ish.

In 2018, Leatherwood was cast in the lead male role as Nicholas Scratch in Netflix's supernatural horror series Chilling Adventures of Sabrina. He also made a cameo appearance as Sabrina Carpenter's love interest in the music video for her single Skin. Leatherwood appears in the main cast in season 1 of the HBO Max teen comedy-drama streaming television series The Sex Lives of College Girls, created by Mindy Kaling in late 2021.

Music career
Apart from acting, Leatherwood released his debut single "Just For Tonight" on February 19, 2021. He has worked with Boom Forest Music, Thomas Dutton and Gavin McDonald to help produce different aspects of this song. He released the single “Driftwood Mermaid” on October 22 2021.  Leatherwood then released "Be My Lover" on April 8, 2022, before releasing his debut EP "Moonlighting" on October 21, 2022.

Personal life 
In addition to acting, Leatherwood plays a variety of instruments including the guitar, ukulele, and piano.

Filmography

References 

1994 births
21st-century American male actors
Living people
American male television actors
American people of Irish descent
American people of Welsh descent
American people of Spanish descent
American people of English descent
American people who self-identify as being of Native American descent
Male actors from California
Male actors from Oregon
Male actors from Hawaii